FC Brașov may refer to:

 FC Brașov (1936), the original football club named FC Brașov, founded in 1936 and dissolved in 2017 from Brașov, Romania
 FC Brașov (2021), the current football club which is legally allowed to use FC Brașov's logo, brand and football records from Brașov, Romania
 SR Brașov, a fans-owned football club from Brașov, Romania